The 2008 Atlantic Coast Conference men's basketball tournament took place from March 13–16, 2008, at the Charlotte Bobcats Arena in Charlotte, North Carolina. The tournament was broadcast on the ESPN family of networks, along with Raycom Sports in the ACC footprint. Both broadcasters had the games available in HD.

Florida State and Miami won their first-round games for the second year in a row. Miami became the first #5 seed to win an ACC tournament game since the conference expanded to 12 teams. The past two seasons, the #12 seed pulled off the upset.

Tyler Hansbrough of North Carolina was named tournament MVP.

Bracket 

AP Rankings at time of tournament

References

Tournament
ACC men's basketball tournament
College sports in North Carolina
Basketball competitions in Charlotte, North Carolina
ACC men's basketball tournament
ACC men's basketball tournament